= Hypokremnos =

Town of ancient Ionia

Coordinates: 38°19′38″N 26°38′57″E

Hypokremnos (Ancient Greek: Ὑπόκρημνος) was a town of ancient Ionia.

Its site is located near the modern Gülbahce, Asian Turkey.
